Jackson–Washington State Forest is a state forest in Jackson and Washington Counties, Indiana, near the town of Brownstown. Jackson–Washington State Forest offers camping, fishing, hunting, archery, and trails for hiking, horseback riding, and cycling.

Picnic Area-Jackson State Forest

Picnic Area-Jackson State Forest, also known as the Knob Creek Upper Picnic Area, is a historic picnic area located in Jackson–Washington State Forest, Driftwood Township, Jackson County, Indiana. It is nestled in an oak grove on a hillside to the northwest above the former Sawmill Lake. Built in 1934 by the Civilian Conservation Corps, the area includes six contributing resources: the oven shelter, stone platform with table, drinking fountain shelter, two sets of stone steps, and the site, which includes 18 stone and timber picnic tables and five stone fireplace ovens.

It was listed on the National Register of Historic Places in 1997.

References

Indiana state forests
Civilian Conservation Corps in Indiana
Park buildings and structures on the National Register of Historic Places in Indiana
Protected areas of Jackson County, Indiana
Protected areas of Washington County, Indiana
Buildings and structures in Jackson County, Indiana
National Register of Historic Places in Jackson County, Indiana